The Yellow Dog may refer to:

 Maigret and the Yellow Dog, a novel by the Belgian writer Georges Simenon
 The Yellow Dog (1932 film), a film adaptation directed by Jean Tarride
 The Yellow Dog (1918 film), an American silent drama film
 Nickname of wrestler Brian Pillman

See also
 The Yellow Dogs, an Iranian-American rock band